Florea Birtașu (1 February 1930 - 9 February 2018) was a Romanian football goalkeeper.

International career
Florea Birtașu played three games at international level for Romania, making his debut under coach Ștefan Dobay in a 1–0 loss against Czechoslovakia at the 1954 World Cup qualifiers. His following two games were friendlies, a 1–0 victory against Norway and a 4–1 loss against Sweden.

Honours
Dinamo București
Divizia A: 1971–72
Progresul București
Cupa României: 1959–60

Notes

References

External links
Florea Birtașu at Labtof.ro

1930 births
2018 deaths
Romanian footballers
Romania international footballers
Association football goalkeepers
Liga I players
Liga II players
FC Petrolul Ploiești players
FC Dinamo București players
FC Progresul București players